The 16th Airborne Command and Control Squadron was a United States Air Force squadron assigned to Air Combat Command's 461st Air Control Wing, 461st Operations Group, stationed at Robins Air Force Base, Georgia. The squadron previously flew the Northrop Grumman E-8C JSTARS, providing airborne battle management, command and control, surveillance, and target acquisition with the last E-8C flight on September 8, 2022.

Mission
The 16th Squadron operated the Northrop Grumman E-8C Joint STARS (Joint Surveillance Target Attack Radar System), an advanced ground surveillance and battle management system. J-STARS detected, located, classified, tracks and targets ground movements on the battlefield, communicating real-time information through secure data links with combat command posts.

History

World War II
The squadron was first activated as the 380th Fighter Squadron, part of IV Fighter Command in early 1943.  It engaged in the air defense of the San Francisco area as well as acting as a Replacement Training Unit until the end of 1943.   It trained as a North American P-51 Mustang operational squadron before deploying to the European Theater of Operations.  In Europe it became part of IX Fighter Command in England.  Operated both as a tactical fighter squadron, providing air support to Allied ground forces in France as well as an air defense squadron, attacking enemy aircraft in air-to-air combat over Europe.

The squadron was converted to a tactical reconnaissance squadron in August 1944, when it was redesignated the 160th Tactical Reconnaissance Squadron.   It engaged in hazardous reconnaissance flights over enemy-controlled territory unarmed, gathering intelligence for Allied commanders until the end of combat in Europe, May 1945.   The unit advanced eastward across France using advanced landing grounds, then into the Low Countries and Occupied Germany.

The squadron remained in Germany as part of the occupation forces, returning to Langley Field, Virginia in June 1947.  The unit remained assigned to Tactical Air Command as a reconnaissance squadron.  The squadron was inactivated in 1949.

Cold War
In 1950 the squadron was activated once again at Langley, now designated the 16th Tactical Reconnaissance Squadron. It moved to Shaw Air Force Base, South Carolina in 1958 where it re-equipped with McDonnell RF-101C Voodoo reconnaissance aircraft.  The squadron deployed to south Florida in 1962 during the Cuban Missile Crisis, flying hazardous overflights over Cuba gathering intelligence photos. The unit upgraded to the McDonnell Douglas RF-4C Phantom II in 1965.  It also operated a flight of Martin EB-57E Canberra electronic warfare aircraft.  It added Douglas EB-66 Destroyer jamming aircraft beginning in 1971 as part of the phaseout of the Destroyer at Shaw.  It was the last USAF active duty B-57 squadron, retiring the aircraft in 1976 when F-4G Phantom IIs took over its mission.

The 16th remained the single RF-4C squadron at Shaw after the 1982 realignment of its parent 363d from a tactical reconnaissance to tactical fighter wing.  It continued reconnaissance training in the United States until 1989 when the RF-4Cs were transferred to 67th Tactical Reconnaissance Wing at Bergstrom Air Force Base, Texas, and the squadron was inactivated.

Joint Surveillance Target Attack Radar System
The squadron was reactivated as the 16th Airborne Command and Control Squadron in 1996 at Robins Air Force Base, Georgia as an E-8 JSTARS squadron.  In 2002, the JSTARS mission was transferred to the Georgia Air National Guard and the 116th Air Control Wing and the squadron became a Guard unit.  Ten years later the mission returned to the regular Air Force, with Georgia Air National Guard associate units joining the mission. As a JSTARS squadron, the 16th flew over 5,030 combat sorties, totalling 51,138 combat hours, and earned 9 Headquarters Air Force Battle Management Aircrew of the Year awards.

Lineage
 Constituted as the 380th Fighter Squadron (Single Engine) on 11 February 1943
 Activated on March 1943
 Redesignated 160th Tactical Reconnaissance Squadron on 25 August 1944
 Redesignated 160th Reconnaissance Squadron, Photographic on 29 Ju1y 1946
 Redesignated 160th Tactical Reconnaissance Squadron, Photographic on 14 June 1948
 Inactivated on 26 April 1949
 Redesignated 160th Tactical Reconnaissance Squadron, Night Photographic on 8 August 1950
 Activated on 1 September 1950
 Redesignated 16th Tactical Reconnaissance Squadron, Night Photographic on 10 October 1950
 Redesignated 16th Tactical Reconnaissance Squadron, Night Photographic-Jet on 8 November 1955
 Redesignated 16th Tactical Reconnaissance Squadron, Photographic-Jet on 1 March 1965
 Redesignated 16th Tactical Reconnaissance Squadron on 8 October 1966
 Redesignated 16th Tactical Reconnaissance Training Squadron on 1 October 1979
 Redesignated 16th Tactical Reconnaissance Squadron on 1 July 1982
 Inactivated on 15 December 1989
 Redesignated 16th Airborne Command and Control Squadron on 15 January 1996
 Activated on 1 October 1996
 Inactivated on 16 February 2023
 Allotted to the Air National Guard on 1 October 2002
 Withdrawn from the Air National Guard on 1 October 2012 (remained active)

Assignments
 363d Fighter Group (later 363d Tactical Reconnaissance Group), 1 March 1943
 Air echelon attached to 10th Photographic Group, 24 December 1944 – 6 February 1945
 10th Reconnaissance Group, 15 November 1945
 Tactical Air Command, 25 June 1947
 363d Reconnaissance Group (later 363d Tactical Reconnaissance Group), 24 July 1947 – 26 April 1949
 363d Tactical Reconnaissance Group, 1 September 1950
 363d Tactical Reconnaissance Wing (later 363d Tactical Fighter) Wing), 8 February 1958 – 13 December 1989
 93d Operations Group, 1 October 1996
 116th Operations Group, 1 October 2002
 461st Operations Group, 1 October 2012 – 16 February 2023

Stations

 Hamilton Field, California, March 1943
 Santa Rosa Army Air Field, California, 23 August 1943
 Oakland Municipal Airport, California, 8 October-2 December 1943
 RAF Keevil (AAF-471), England, 23 December 1943
 RAF Rivenhall (AAF-168), England, c. 3 February 1944
 RAF Staplehurst (AAF-413), England, 14 April 1944
 Maupertu Airfield (A-15), France, c. 5 July 1944
 Azeville Airfield (A-7), France, c. 22 August 1944
 Montreuil Airfield (A-38), France, 9 September 1944
 Sandweiler Airfield (A-97), Luxembourg, 11 October 1944
 Le Culot Airfield (A-89), Belgium, 29 October 1944
 Operated from Conflans Airfield (A-94), France, 24 December 1944 – 6 February 1945
 Venlo Airfield (Y-55), Netherlands, 11 March 1945

 Gutersloh Airfield (R-85), Germany, 16 April 1945
 Brunswick/Waggum Airfield (R-37), Germany, 26 April 1945
 AAF Station Wiesbaden, Germany, 20 May 1945
 AAF Station Eschwege, Germany, 12 July 1945
 AAF Station Darmstadt/Griesheim, Germany, 22 September 1945
 AAF Station Fürth, Germany, 24 November 1945
 Fürstenfeldbruck Air Base, Germany, 2 March 1947
 Bad Kissingen Air Base, Germany, 14 June 1947
 Langley Field (later Langley Air Force Base), Virginia, 25 June 1947 – 26 April 1949
 Langley Ai Force Base, Virginia, 1 September 1950
 Shaw Air Force Base, South Carolina, 8 February 1958 – 31 December 1989
 Operated from MacDill Air Force Base, Florida, 22 October-30 November 1962
 Robins Air Force Base, Georgia, 1 October 1996 – 16 February 2023

Aircraft

 Bell P-39 Airacobra, 1943
 North American P-51 Mustang, 1944–1945, 1946–1947
 North American F-6 Mustang, 1944–1945, 1946–1947
 Lockheed FP-80 Shooting Star (later Lockheed RF-80 Shooting Star), 1947–1949
 Douglas RB-26 Invader, 1950–1955
 Martin RB-57 Canberra, 1954–1956
 Douglas RB-66 Destroyer, 1956–1965
 McDonnell RF-101C Voodoo, 1958–1965
 McDonnell RF-4C Phantom II, 1965–1989
 Martin EB-57E Canberra, 1971–1976
 Northrop Grumman E-8C Joint STARS (1996–September 2022)

See also

References

Notes
 Explanatory notes

 Citations

Bibliography

 
 
 
 
 
 
 World Airpower Journal. (1992). US Air Force Air Power Directory.  Aerospace Publishing: London, UK. 
 

Military units and formations in Georgia (U.S. state)
016
Squadrons of the United States Air National Guard
Command and control squadrons of the United States Air Force